The Men's 56 kg weightlifting event at the 2006 Commonwealth Games took place at the Melbourne Exhibition Centre on 16 March 2006.

Amirul Hamizan Ibrahim was the defending champion, but was unable to defend the title due to the two years doping ban.

Schedule
All times are Australian Eastern Standard Time (UTC+10)

Records
Prior to this competition, the existing world, Commonwealth and Games records were as follows:

Results

References

Weightlifting at the 2006 Commonwealth Games